"Roc Boys (And the Winner Is)..." is the second single from Jay-Z's tenth studio album, American Gangster. The song is produced by Skyz Muzik, Diddy and two of his producers known as LV and Sean C from his production team, The Hitmen. It features additional vocals by Beyoncé, Kanye West and Cassie. The song samples "Make the Road by Walking" by The Menahan Street Band. On December 11, 2007, Rolling Stone named it the best song of 2007.

Music video
The music video was directed by Chris Robinson and costume designed by June Ambrose. The video was shot in New York City in Jay-Z's The 40/40 Club.

The intro of the video contains the chorus from Hello Brooklyn 2.0. The video features cameo appearances by Nas, Rick Ross, Memphis Bleek, Diddy, Freeway, Terrence J, Tru Life, Young Gunz, Jadakiss, Yaya DaCosta, Swizz Beatz, Drew Sidora, Kristia Krueger, Chain 4, Chantel, Beanie Sigel, Cassie, DJ Clue, Larry Johnson, Tristan Wilds, Just Blaze, Zab Judah, The-Dream, Irv Gotti and Mariah Carey. Kanye West is not featured in the video because of a scheduling conflict, at the time he was on tour in Dubai, as posted in his blog.

The young Jay-Z was portrayed by actor Samgoma Edwards. Director Chris Robinson personally sought out Edwards for the role after Edwards and his older brother Samtubia Edwards and friend Chris Alvarez shot their own video project titled "The Young Hov Project", based on tracks from Jay-Z's The Black Album.

Remixes and sampling
Beanie Sigel has also announced that he and Jadakiss have finished the official remix of the track, which features the both of them on vocals. However, there is an alternate remix featuring Young Chris from the Young Gunz and Busta Rhymes.

Rapper Asher Roth samples Roc Boys extensively in his own version of the song called Roth Boys which was released on his debut mixtape The Greenhouse Effect

Numerous freestyles were conducted by several artists such as Wale (present in The Mixtape About Nothing), Asher Roth (present in "The Greenhouse Effect"), and Rick Ross.

This song was also sampled by The Game and Lil Wayne in the song "Red Magic" with the chorus by Lil Wayne, singing excerpts of "Roc Boys (And the Winner Is)" chorus.

The song is referenced (if only in title) by fellow rapper and Jay-Z collaborator Saigon (rapper) on his debut album The Greatest Story Never Told.

The song is sampled heavily in Girl Talk's song "Set It Off".

The song was also sampled heavily in a remix produced by Norwegian DJ Matoma.

Charts

Weekly charts

Year-end charts

In popular culture

The instrumental version of “Roc Boys” is played at San Francisco Giants home games at Oracle Park as starting lineups are introduced.

See also
List of songs recorded by Jay-Z

References

External links
 "Roc Boys (And the Winner Is)..." at Discogs

2007 singles
2008 singles
Jay-Z songs
Music videos directed by Chris Robinson (director)
Songs written by Jay-Z
Roc-A-Fella Records singles
2007 songs
Jazz rap songs